Pagoda at the Wuta Temople is a religious architectural work, located in Haidian District, Beijing. The temple was first constructed during the Yongle Reign of the Ming Dynasty and has been destroyed, only leaving the pagoda on the vajracchedika throne completed in 1473. The whole structure, made of bricks and bluestones, consists of the throne foundation with front and a black stone arch and a stone stair to the top of the throne. Atop the throne are a colored glaze dome pavilion and five smaller pagodas carved with Buddha images, Sanskrit and religious decorations.

Buildings and structures in Beijing